Tahir ibn Muslim was the first Husaynid emir, or sharif, of Medina.

He was the son of Abu Ja'far Muslim, a descendant in the ninth generation of Husayn ibn Ali. Abu Ja'far had migrated to Egypt from Medina, where the Husaynid line was prominent, and became an important figure at the court of the Ikhshidids and later the Fatimids. 

Sometime shortly after his father's death in 976/7, Tahir returned to Medina, where he was quickly recognized by the rest of the Husaynids as their leader. He initially recognized the Abbasid caliph al-Ta'i, but the Fatimid caliph al-Aziz Billah sent an army which forced him to shift his allegiance to the Fatimids instead.

He remained as ruler of Medina until he died in 992, being succeeded by his son al-Hasan. Tahir's line was deposed and replaced by a collateral Husaynid line in 1007, led by Da'ud in al-Qasim.

References

Sources
 

992 deaths
10th-century Arabs
Sharifs of Medina
Vassal rulers of the Fatimid Caliphate